The Mashona mole-rat (Fukomys darlingi) is a species of rodent in the family Bathyergidae. It is found in Mozambique and Zimbabwe. Its natural habitats are subtropical or tropical dry shrubland, subtropical or tropical dry lowland grassland, and caves.

References

Woods, C. A. and C. W. Kilpatrick. 2005.  pp 1538–1600 in Mammal Species of the World a Taxonomic and Geographic Reference 3rd ed. D. E. Wilson and D. M. Reeder eds. Smithsonian Institution Press, Washington D.C.

Fukomys
Mammals described in 1895
Taxa named by Oldfield Thomas
Taxonomy articles created by Polbot